Isolde Kostner (born 20 March 1975) is an Italian former Alpine skier who won two bronze medals at the 1994 Winter Olympics and a silver medal at the 2002 Winter Olympics. She was the Italian flag bearer at the opening ceremony of the 2002 Olympics.

Biography
Kostner won two gold medals in Super-G at the Alpine Ski World Championships in 1996 and 1997, and in 2001 and 2002 she won the World Cup discipline title in Downhill.
Her first World Cup win was in the downhill on 29 January 1994, at Garmisch-Partenkirchen this was, however, overshadowed by the death of Ulrike Maier on the same day.

Kostner was born in Bolzano. Her cousin and goddaughter is Carolina Kostner, the 2012 World champion and 2014 Olympic bronze medalist in figure skating. She announced her retirement on 10 January 2006.

World Cup results

Overall victories

Individual victories

Season standings

See also
 Italian sportswomen multiple medalists at Olympics and World Championships
 Italy national alpine ski at the World championships
 Italian skiers who closed in top 10 in overall World Cup
 Italian skiers with the most podiums in the World Cup

References

External links
 

1975 births
Living people
Sportspeople from Bolzano
Italian female alpine skiers
Ladin people
Alpine skiers at the 1994 Winter Olympics
Alpine skiers at the 1998 Winter Olympics
Alpine skiers at the 2002 Winter Olympics
Olympic silver medalists for Italy
Olympic bronze medalists for Italy
Olympic alpine skiers of Italy
Olympic medalists in alpine skiing
FIS Alpine Ski World Cup champions
Alpine skiers of Fiamme Gialle
Medalists at the 2002 Winter Olympics
Medalists at the 1994 Winter Olympics